The Bandy World Championship for women 2014 is being contested between 6 bandy playing countries. The championship is played in Lappeenranta, Finland from 19 to 22 February.

Russia won the tournament, defeating Sweden 5-3, in the final-game.

England planned to participate, but was eventually not scheduled to appear.

Participating teams

Venue

Group stage

Wednesday 19 February 2014

Thursday 20 February 2014

Friday 21 February 2014

Standings

Play Offs

Semi-finals, Friday 21 February 2014

Match for 5th place, Saturday 22 February 2014

Match for 3rd place, Saturday 22 February 2014

Final, Saturday 22 February 2014

Final standing

References

External links
 https://archive.today/20140126040425/http://worldbandywomen.fi/en/

2014 in bandy
2014 in Finnish women's sport
2014
International bandy competitions hosted by Finland
 
February 2014 sports events in Europe